Rugby Park in Kilmarnock, Scotland is the home ground of Kilmarnock F.C.

Rugby Park can also refer to a number of other stadiums in the English-speaking world:

 In Australia:
 Rugby Park, Rockhampton, home to the Central Queensland Rugby Union and a host of Queensland Country matches in the NRC
 In New Zealand:
 Rugby Park, Greymouth,  the former name of John Sturgeon Park
 Rugby Park Stadium in Invercargill, home to the Southland Rugby Football Union and occasionally a host of Highlanders matches in Super Rugby
 Rugby Park is a former stadium in Hamilton that stood on the current site of Waikato Stadium
 Rugby Park in Gisborne, home to the Poverty Bay Rugby Football Union

See also
 Rugby League Park, a separate stadium also in Christchurch, and temporary home to the Crusaders of Super Rugby.